The 2003 Atlantic 10 men's basketball tournament was played from March 10 to March 15, 2003. The winner was named champion of the Atlantic 10 Conference and received an automatic bid to the 2003 NCAA Men's Division I Basketball Tournament. The University of Dayton won the tournament and got the conference's automatic bid to the NCAA Tournament. Xavier and Saint Joseph's also received bids to the NCAA Tournament. Rhode Island, Richmond and Temple received bids to the 2003 National Invitation Tournament. Ramod Marshall of Dayton was named the tournament's Most Outstanding Player. Future NBA players Jameer Nelson of Saint Joseph's and David West of Xavier were among those joining Marshall on the All-Championship Team.

Format
The tournament was a single-elimination tournament. Seeding was determined by the regular season standings in each division. With the conference divided into East and West divisions, the top two teams in each division received a first-round bye.

St. Bonaventure was forced to forfeit its six conference wins after forward Jamil Terrell was declared academically ineligible.  The Atlantic 10 also barred the Bonnies from participating in the conference tournament.  The Bonnies would have been the fourth seed from the East Division.  However, with their banishment from the tournament, West Division #3 seed Richmond automatically got a first round bye.

The first round was played at the home arena of the higher seed. The remaining games were played at the University of Dayton Arena in Dayton, Ohio.

Bracket

References 

Atlantic 10 men's basketball tournament
Tournament
Atlantic 10 men's basketball tournament
Atlantic 10 men's basketball tournament